Kouroudel  is a village and rural commune in Mauritania.

References

Communes of Mauritania